Church Congress is an annual meeting of members of the Church of England, lay and clerical, to discuss matters religious, moral or social, in which the church is interested. It has no legislative authority, and there is no voting on the questions discussed.

History

The first congress was held in 1861 in the hall of King's College, Cambridge, and was the outcome of the revival of convocation in 1852. From 1879 the congress included an Ecclesiastical and Educational Art Exhibition.

The congress is under the presidency of the bishop in whose diocese it happens to be held.  The meetings of the congress have been mainly remarkable as illustrating the wide divergences of opinion and practice in the Church of England, no less than the broad spirit of tolerance which has made this possible and honorably differentiates these meetings from so many ecclesiastical assemblies of the past. The congress of 1908 was especially distinguished, not only for the expression of diametrically opposed views on such questions as the sacrifice of the mass or the higher criticism, but for the very large proportion of time given to the discussion of the attitude of the Church towards socialism and kindred subjects.

Meetings

Historical places of meeting are:

King's College, Cambridge 1861
Oxford 1862
Manchester 1863
Bristol 1864
Norwich 1865
York 1866 
Wolverhampton 1867 
Dublin 1868
Liverpool 1869 
Southampton 1870
Nottingham 1871
Leeds 1872
Bath 1873
Brighton 1874
Stoke on Trent 1875
Plymouth 1876
Croydon 1877
Sheffield 1878
Swansea 1879
Leicester 1880
Newcastle 1881
Derby 1882
Reading 1883
Carlisle 1884
Portsmouth 1885
Wakefield 1886
Wolverhampton 1887
Manchester 1888
Cardiff 1889
Kingston upon Hull 1890
Rhyl 1891
Folkestone 1892
Birmingham 1893
Exeter 1894
Norwich 1895
Shrewsbury 1896
Nottingham 1897
Bradford 1898
London 1899
Newcastle 1900
Brighton 1901 
Northampton 1902
Bristol 1903
Liverpool 1904
Weymouth 1905
Barrow-in-Furness 1906
Great Yarmouth 1907 
Manchester 1908
Swansea 1909
Cambridge 1910
Stoke on Trent 1911
Middlesbrough 1912
Southampton 1913
suspended 1914 - 1918
Leicester 1919
Southend on Sea 1920
Birmingham 1921
Sheffield 1922
Plymouth 1923
Oxford 1924
Eastbourne 1925
Southport 1926
Ipswich 1927
Cheltenham 1928
Newport 1930

References

Church of England ecclesiastical polity